Dan Jones (4 August 1810 – 3 January 1862) (often referred to as Captain Dan) was an influential Welsh missionary of the Church of Jesus Christ of Latter-day Saints. Jones is well known for having heard the "final prophecy" of Joseph Smith, namely, that Jones would fulfil a mission to Wales before he died.

Early life
Jones was born in Halkyn, in the county of Flintshire, north-east Wales, the sixth of Thomas Jones and Ruth Roberts's eight children.

When he was sixteen years old, Jones became a sailor. On 3 January 1837, Jones married Jane Melling, a childhood friend from Halkyn. In 1840, Jones and his wife emigrated to the United States, where Jones became captain of the Ripple, a steamship on the Mississippi River. The Ripple primarily carried passengers between New Orleans and St. Louis. After the Ripple struck a rock and sank, Jones captained the Maid of Iowa, which could transport approximately 300 passengers.

Conversion
During his travels on the Mississippi River, Jones heard of the Church of Jesus Christ of Latter Day Saints, which had recently moved its headquarters to Nauvoo, Illinois, a city on the river. Jones sought out the Latter Day Saints to learn about the new religious movement. He believed what the missionaries told him and was subsequently baptized into the church in January 1843. The following April, Jones used the Maid of Iowa to transport approximately 300 English Latter Day Saint converts from Mississippi to Nauvoo. Jones also used his ship to haul freight required for the building of the Nauvoo Temple. Joseph Smith preached from the deck of the Maid of Iowa on more than one occasion.

Joseph Smith and the "final prophecy"
In June 1844, Joseph and Hyrum Smith were arrested and imprisoned in Carthage Jail. With Willard Richards and John Taylor, Jones was chosen to accompany the Smiths to jail to offer support and protection. The night before Joseph and Hyrum were killed, Joseph Smith asked Jones if he was afraid to die. Jones replied, "Has that time come, think you? Engaged in such a cause, I do not think that death would have many terrors.” Smith replied with what many have identified as his "last prophecy": "You will yet see Wales and fulfill the mission appointed you before you die."

The following morning, 27 June 1844, Smith asked Jones to deliver a letter on his behalf to Orville H. Browning in Quincy, Illinois, requesting that Browning act as the Smiths' lawyer in their upcoming trial. As Jones departed the jail on horseback, bullets were fired at him, but none struck him. In his haste and panic, Jones took the wrong road to Quincy and became lost. It was later learned that a mob had been waiting to intercept him on the correct road to Quincy. When Jones finally reached Quincy later in the afternoon, he learned that Joseph and Hyrum Smith had been killed by a mob at the jail.

First mission to Wales
In late 1844, Brigham Young asked Jones to return to Wales as a missionary for the church. Jones and his wife traveled to England with Wilford Woodruff and a number of other persons who had been asked to serve as missionaries in the British Isles. After approximately one year and little success, Jones was asked to preside over the missionary efforts in Wales. At this time, there were just over 200 Latter-day Saints in Wales. Under Jones's leadership, between 1845 and 1848 the missionaries in Wales baptized approximately 3600 people. In terms of population, one out of every 278 people in Wales at that time was baptized into the Church of Jesus Christ of Latter-day Saints. When Jones left Wales, there were seventy-two branches of the church and 4645 Latter-day Saints.

In 1846, Jones began to publish a Welsh-language periodical for the church entitled Prophwyd y Jubili—Prophet of the Jubilee. It was the first periodical to be published in a language other than English from the Church. In 1847, Jones published the most famous of his many Welsh-language pamphlets and tracts, "Hanes Saint y Dyddiau Diweddaf" ("History of the Latter-day Saints").

Pioneer
On 26 February 1849, Jones departed Wales with over 300 Welsh Latter-day Saint converts. Jones sailed from Liverpool to New Orleans on the Buena Vista and from New Orleans to Council Bluffs, Iowa by riverboat. Once Jones and the Welsh converts arrived in Council Bluffs, the church organised the first Welsh speaking branch of the church in the United States with Jones serving as the branch president.

On 13 July 1849, Jones and many of his Welsh converts left Council Bluffs with other pioneers in the George A. Smith company. Jones arrived in the Salt Lake Valley on 26 October.

Like many early Latter-day Saints, Jones practised plural marriage. On 8 November 1849, shortly after his arrival in the Utah Territory, Jones married his first plural wife, Elizabeth Lewis.

Second mission to Wales
After arriving in the Utah Territory, Jones settled in Manti and was elected mayor in 1851. However, in 1852 church president Brigham Young asked Jones to again return to Wales as a missionary. During this second mission, which lasted until 1856, Jones baptized approximately 2000 persons in Wales, most of whom eventually immigrated to Utah. In 1852, Jones oversaw the translation of the Book of Mormon into the Welsh language; it was only the third language other than English that the book had been published in (previous translations having been published in Danish and French). Jones was briefly the editor of Udgorn Seion, the church's Welsh language periodical that succeeded Jones's Prophwyd y Jubili.

Later life and death
Jones returned to Utah in 1856. However, upon his return he began to suffer ill health, probably partially as a result of his missionary exertions and life's extensive travels. Jones became the captain of the Timely Gull on the Great Salt Lake, a vessel that was owned by Brigham Young and used to carry salt, cedar wood, and flagstone. On 8 November 1849, Jones married a second plural wife, Elizabeth Jones Lewis, in Salt Lake City. On 18 February 1857, Jones married his third plural wife, Mary Matilda LaTrielle, in Salt Lake City.

Jones' first wife, Jane, died on 24 February 1861. Less than one year later, on the 24th anniversary of his marriage to Jane, Jones died of tuberculosis at Provo, Utah Territory, at the age of fifty-one. Jones was survived by six children—two from each of his wives. His first wife gave birth to eight children that did not survive childhood.

Legacy
Apostle Gordon B. Hinckley has stated that Jones "must certainly be included in the half dozen or so most productive missionaries in the history of the Church." One of the dormitories at the Missionary Training Center in Provo, Utah, is called the Dan Jones Building.
An official publication of the church pays tribute to Jones, stating that, "Dan Jones, [was] one of the greatest missionaries" in church history.

Written works
Dan Jones (1845). Y fanw wedi ei chyfodi yn fyw, neu'r, hen grefydd newydd : Traethawd yn dangos anghyfnewidioldeb teyrnas Dduw (The dead raised to life, or, the old religion anew : Treatise showing the immutability of the kingdom of God). Wrexham, Wales: William Bayley.
—— (1846). Amddiffyniad y Saint versus cyhuddiadau Thomas Jones, Merthyr, ac ereill (A defense of the Saints versus the accusations of Thomas Jones, Merthyr, and others). Rhydybont, Wales: John Jones.
—— (1846). Atebydd y gwrthddadleuon a ddygir yn fwyaf cyffredinol drwy y wlad yn erbyn Saint y Dyddiau Diweddaf, a'r athrawiaeth a broffesant : mewn ffurf o ymddyddan, er symud y rhwystrau oddiar ffordd y Cymry ymofyngar, heb "anmhwyllo ynghylch cwestiynau, ac ymryson ynghylch geiriau, o'r rhai y mae cenfigen, ymryson, cableddau, a drwg dybiau yn dyfod : ac na ddaliont ar CHWEDLAU ac achau anorpben, y rhai sydd yn peri cwestiynau, yn hytrach nag adeiladaeth dduwiol, yr hon sydd trwy ffydd: gwnaed [PAWB] felly" (A reply to the objections which are most commonly brought throughout the country against the Latter-day Saints, and the doctrine which they profess : in the form of a dialogue to remove the obstacles from the path of the inquisitive Welsh without "doting about questions and strifes of words, whereof cometh envy, strife, tailings, and evil surmisings : and neither giving heed to FABLES and endless genealogies, which minister questions, rather than godly edifying which is in faith : so do [EVERYONE]"). Rhydybont, Wales: John Jones.
—— (ed.) (1846–48). Prophwyd y Jubili, neu, Seren y Saint; yn cynnwys hanes sefydliad "Goruchwyliaeth cyflawnder yr amseroedd," ynghyd ag erlidigaethau, merthyrdod, ac alltudiaeth ei hufyddion, a'u llwyddiant. (Prophet of the Jubilee, or, Star of the Saints; containing an account of the establishment of the "Dispensation of the fulness of times," together with the persecutions, martyrdom, and exile of its adepts, and their success). Monthly. Rhydybont, Wales: John Jones.
—— (1846). Y glorian, yn yr hon y gwelir David yn pwyso Williams, a Williams yn pwyso David, neu, David Williams, o Abercanaid, yn gwrthddweyd ei hun, wedi ei ddal yn ei dwyll, a'i brofi yn ddeistaidd (The scales, in which are seen David weighing Williams, and Williams weighing David, or, David Williams, from Abercanaid, contradicting himself, caught in his deceit, and proved deistic). Rhydybont, Wales: John Jones.
—— (1847). Adolygiad ar ddarlithoedd y Parch. E. Roberts, (Gweinidog y Bedyddwyr yn Rymni,) yn erbyn Mormoniaeth, pa rai a draddododd yn Nghaersdem, Medi yr Ail, ac yn Bethania (Capel yr Annibynwyr,) Medi y Trydydd, yn Nowlais (A review of the lectures of the Rev. E. Roberts, (a Baptist minister in Rhymney,) against Mormonism, which were delivered in Caersalem, September the Second, and in Bethania (a Congregational chapel,) September the Third, in Dowlais). Rhydybont, Wales: John Jones.
—— (1847). "Amddiffyniad y Saint, yn ngwyneb camgyhuddiadau y rhai a alwant eu hunain yn 'Gwcw y Don'" ("A defense of the Saints against the false accusations of those who call themselves 'Cuckoo of Ton'"), Seren Gomer (Star of Gomer). Rhydybont, Wales, January 1847.
—— (1847). "Haman" yn hongian ar ei grogbren ei hun! neu Daniel Jones (ddall) a'i lyfr yn profi gwirionedd Mormoniaeth!! ("Haman" hanging from his own gallows! or, Daniel Jones (the blind) and his booklet proving the truth of Mormonism!!). Rhydybont, Wales: John Jones.
—— (1847). Hanes Saint y Dyddiau Diweddaf, o'u sefydliad yn y flwyddyn 1823, hyd yr amser yr alltudiwyd tri chan mil o honynt o'r America oherwydd eu crefydd, yn y flwyddyn 1846 (History of the Latter-day Saints, from their establishment in the year 1823, until the time that three hundred thousand of them were exiled from America because of their religion, in the year 1846). Rhydybont, Wales: John Jones.
—— (1850). Tri llythyr oddiwrth Capt. D. Jones, ac un oddiwrth Mrs. Lewis (o Gydweli), o Ddinas y Llyn Halen (Three letters from Capt. D. Jones, and one from Mrs. Lewis (of Kidwelly), from Salt Lake City). Merthyr Tydfil, Wales: John Davis.
—— (1854). Amddiffyniad y Saint : sef, gwrth-brofion o gam-gyhuddiadau maleis-ddrwg dyn o'r enw Rees Davies, o New Orleans, yn erbyn y Saint (A defense of the Saints : refutations of the false and malicious accusations of a man by the name of Rees Davies, from New Orleans, against the Saints). Swansea, Wales: D. Jones.
—— (1854). Annerchiad at offeiraid, parchedigion, pregethwyr, a holl athrawon crefydd yn Nghymru (Proclamation to priests, reverends, preachers, and all teachers of religion in Wales). Merthyr Tydfil, Wales: D. Jones.
—— (1854). Anffyddiaeth sectyddiaeth! (Atheism of sectarianism!). Merthyr Tydfil, Wales: D. Jones.
—— (1854). Dadl rhwng Bedyddiwr ac Anffyddiwr (A debate between a Baptist and an atheist). Merthyr Tydfil, Wales: D. Jones.
—— (1854). Peidiwch a'u gwrando (Do not listen to them). Swansea, Wales: D. Jones.
—— (1855). Anmhoblogrwydd "Mormoniaeth"? (Unpopularity of "Mormonism"?). Swansea, Wales: D. Jones.
—— (1855). Yr anweinydd i Seion (The guide to Zion). Swansea, Wales: D. Jones.

Notes

References
 Rex LeRoy Christensen, “The Life and Contributions of Captain Dan Jones,” Master’s thesis, Utah State University, 1977.
 Rex LeRoy Christensen, “I Have a Question: I've heard that a Dan Jones was one of the most successful missionaries of the early church. Can you tell me more about him?” Ensign, March 1982, p. 19.
 Ronald D. Dennis, “Dan Jones, Welshman: Taking the Gospel Home”, Ensign, April 1987, p. 50.
 Gordon B. Hinckley, “The Thing of Most Worth”, Ensign, September 1993, p. 2.
 Shannon W. Ostler, “Dan Jones—Welsh Missionary” Friend'', October 1987, p. 40.

External links
WelshMormonHistory.org resources on Dan Jones

1810 births
1862 deaths
19th-century Mormon missionaries
19th-century translators
American Latter Day Saints
American sailors
British Latter Day Saints
Converts to Mormonism
Editors of Latter Day Saint publications
Mayors of places in Utah
Missionary linguists
Mormon missionaries in Wales
Mormon pioneers
People from Flintshire
Translators of the Book of Mormon
Welsh Latter Day Saint writers
Welsh Latter Day Saints
Welsh Mormon missionaries
Welsh emigrants to the United States
Welsh leaders of the Church of Jesus Christ of Latter-day Saints
Welsh-language writers